Tsarevich Prosha is a 1974 Soviet family film directed by Nadezhda Kosheverova.

Plot 
Tsarevich Prosh lives in one kingdom. Suddenly he had a wonderful dream and Prosh did not want to tell this dream to his father. The tsar did not like this, and he drove Prosh out of the kingdom.

Cast 
 Sergey Martynov as Prosha
 Valeriy Zolotukhin as Lutonya
 Tatyana Shestakova as Princess
 Yevgeniy Tilicheev as Derdidas
 Valeri Nosik as Okh
 Aleksandr Benyaminov as Mops
 Tatyana Pelttser as Berta
 Sergey Filippov as Ataman
 Georgiy Vitsin as Katorz IX

References

External links 
 

1974 films
1970s Russian-language films
Soviet children's films
Films based on fairy tales
Films directed by Nadezhda Kosheverova